Le Désespéré (Desperation or The Desperate Man) is an oil-on-canvas self-portrait by Gustave Courbet, produced in 1843–1845, early during his stay in Paris. It is now in the private collection of the Conseil Investissement Art BNP Paribas but was displayed in the Musée d'Orsay's 2007 Courbet exhibition

In the 1840s Courbet produced portraits of his friends and clients as well as self-portraits, including Self-Portrait with a Black Dog (1842). He spent time in the Louvre copying works by José de Ribera, Zurbaran, Velasquez and Rembrandt which started to influence his work. He broke from his traditional vertical format for the work. He was attached to Le Désespéré, taking it with him when he went into exile in Switzerland in 1873. A few years later doctor Paul Collin's description of Courbet's studio included a mention of "a painting showing Courbet with a desperate expression, for this reason entitled Désespoir".

References

Bibliography (in French)
 Courbet sur le site du Musée d'Orsay
 Le désespéré: une courte vidéo sur Dailymotion
 Coli Jorge : « L’Atelier de Courbet », in : Art Absolument, Autumn 2007, no. 22, p. 59-63

Paintings by Gustave Courbet
Courbet
19th-century portraits
1845 paintings
Romantic paintings